Luncarty railway station served the village of Luncarty, Perth and Kinross, Scotland, from 1848 to 1951 on the Scottish Midland Junction Railway.

History 
The station opened on 2 August 1848 by the Scottish Midland Junction Railway.  It closed to both passengers and goods traffic on 18 June 1951.

References

External links 

Disused railway stations in Perth and Kinross
Former Caledonian Railway stations
Railway stations in Great Britain opened in 1848
Railway stations in Great Britain closed in 1951
1848 establishments in Scotland
1951 disestablishments in Scotland